Norman O'Bryan could mean:
 Sir Norman O'Bryan (1894–1968), Australian barrister and judge, Justice on the Supreme Court of Victoria
 Norman O'Bryan (1930–2013), son of the above, who was also an Australian barrister and judge who sat on the Supreme Court of Victoria